Prostitution among animals is the phenomena where different species of non-human animals practice the exchange of sex for different benefits. This concept is also known as transactional sex.

Penguins use stones for building their nests. Based on a 1998 study, media reports stated that a shortage of stones led female Adélie penguins to trade sex for stones. Some pair-bonded female penguins copulate with males who are not their mates and then take pebbles for their own nests. Chimpanzees who appear to be trading food for sex have also been described as engaging in prostitution.

The notion of such "transactional sex" among chimpanzees has been criticized by many scholars, citing that androcentric bias and researchers projecting their own gendered assumptions onto non-human animals may play a significant role in interpretations of "prostitution".

Penguins 

Prostitution in animals was first reported in 1998 by Fiona Hunter, a researcher at the University of Cambridge, and Lloyd Davis of the University of Otago, who had spent five years observing the mating behavior of Adélie penguins.

According to the report about the study published by BBC News Online, some female penguins engage in sexual activity with penguins other than their partners. These female penguins have sex with unattached males and take a pebble from the male's nest after having sex (Pebbles are used for building nests, but are scarce, and hence valuable.) In an actual study, the researchers speculate that the female has bent over to grab a stone and the male has misinterpreted the gesture—she hasn't changed her mind or performed a trick. But researchers are still studying the phenomenon, and a consensus has not yet been reached; it is assumed that either the female is baiting, or that the male deliberately chooses to misinterpret the gesture, as rape is common among these penguins. The BBC further reported Hunter as saying that the female penguins probably didn't engage in prostitution only for stones. Hunter believed "what they are doing is having copulation for another reason and just taking the stones as well. We don't know exactly why, but they are using the males".  This behavior was also suggested as a mate choice process by which the females might find a possible future mate.  This would provide a female penguin with another male penguin should their current mate die. The male penguins, the study speculates, were engaged in sex with the prostitute females only for sexual satisfaction. According to Hunter's observation, the number of prostitute penguins was very low, and she approximated this as "only a few percent".

While the sensationalized versions of the study emphasize prostitution, the research data itself is less sensational. The data shows that when extra pair copulation occurs at the male's nesting site, the female takes one or more stones; but when the extra pair copulation occurs at the female's nesting site, the male never takes a stone. A male who has copulated with a female benefits his progeny when she takes a stone.  Sometimes copulation doesn't occur, but the female still takes a stone.  But both males and females steal stones: sometimes they are successful and sometimes they are attacked. The female is not always willing to copulate to avoid a fight. The researchers speculate about the possible genetic fitness advantages and disadvantages of the practice, and aren't altogether sure that the female copulates mainly in order to obtain a stone.

Chimpanzees

A study conducted by the Max Planck Institute for Evolutionary Anthropology in Leipzig, Germany, and published online in the Public Library of Science, attempted to support the meat-for-sex behavior hypothesis, according to which, in early human societies the best male hunters had the maximum number of sexual partners. Unable to study early humans, researchers studied chimpanzees. Researchers observed chimpanzees in the Taï National Park and concluded that a form of prostitution exists among the chimpanzees in which females offer sex to males in exchange for meat. According to Cristina Gomes of the Institute, the study "strongly suggests that wild chimpanzees exchange meat for sex, and do so on a long-term basis". The data reveal that chimps enter into communities of hunting and sharing meat with each other over long periods of time and females within the meat-sharing community tend to copulate with males of their own meat-sharing community.  Direct exchange of meat for sex has not been observed.

Capuchin monkeys

A study at Yale–New Haven Hospital trains capuchin monkeys to use silver discs as money in order to study their economic behavior. The discs could be exchanged by the monkeys for various treats. During one chaotic incident, a researcher observed what appeared to be a monkey exchanging a disc for sex. The monkey that was paid for sex immediately traded the silver disc for a grape. The researcher subsequently took steps to prevent any possibility of coins being traded for sex.

See also
 Animal sexual behaviour
 Bonobo sexual behaviour

References

Further reading
 

Prostitution
Animal sexuality